Andrew Quigley (1868 or 1869–1937) was a unionist politician in Northern Ireland.

Quigley worked for the Post Office.  In 1929, he was elected to the Senate of Northern Ireland as an Ulster Unionist Party representative, despite having no previous political experience.   He served until his death in 1937.

References

1860s births
1937 deaths
Members of the Senate of Northern Ireland 1929–1933
Members of the Senate of Northern Ireland 1933–1937
Ulster Unionist Party members of the Senate of Northern Ireland